(born June 19, 1980), is a Japanese voice actress.

Voice roles

Anime
2000
Shiawase Sou no Okojo-san (Hyaho, Miyu, Ruka, Ruru)
Yobarete Tobidete Akubi-chan (Akubi-chan)

2002
Shrine of the Morning Mist (Girl B)
Tokyo Mew Mew (Hanacha)
Panyo Panyo Di Gi Charat (Elizabeth)
Fortune Dogs (Howhitey, Puppy)
UFO Ultramaiden Valkyrie (Remi)

2003
Wolf's Rain (Researcher B)
on-chan Yume Power Daibōken (Haruka)
The Galaxy Railways (Kate)
Green Green (Female Student)
Princess Tutu (Tsuchibutannu)
UFO Ultramaiden Valkyrie 2: December Nocturne (Midori)

2004
Elfen Lied (Secretary)
Sgt. Frog (Girl, Kitten, Poyan, Yayoi)
Fafner (Female Student)
Futakoi (Man B)
Black Jack (Announcement, Baby, Chaco, Girl, Hiroko, Luna Luna, Passenger, Yuuichi)
Magical Girl Lyrical Nanoha (Farin)
Yakitate!! Japan (Hiromi Kawachi)

2005
Shuffle! (Part-time Jobber)
Futari wa Pretty Cure Max Heart (Lulun)
Magical Girl Lyrical Nanoha A's (Farin, Lieze Aria)
Loveless (Female Student)

2006
Welcome to the NHK (Miki Saida)
Ginga Tetsudo Monogatari: Eien e no Bunkiten (Kate)
Kekkaishi (Young Girl)
Hell Girl (Yumi)
Strain: Strategic Armored Infantry (Carmicheal)
Nishi no Yoki Majo (Woman B)
Yomigaeru Sora (Chiemi Nakakura, Sakura Okada)
Wan Wan Serebu Soreyuke! Tetsunoshin (Hiroko, Yuki Yagino)

2007
Dinosaur King (Gabu, Loa, Mihasa)
Sayonara, Zetsubou-Sensei (Kiri Komori, Mayo Mitama)
Shonen Onmyouji (Nagako)

2008
Zoku Sayonara Zetsubō Sensei (Kiri Komori)

2009
Zan Sayonara Zetsubō Sensei (Kiri Komori)
Stitch! ~Itazura Alien no Daibōken~ (Mr. Stenchy)

2010
Dance in the Vampire Bund (Nero)

2011
Is This a Zombie? (Kumacchi)

Other
Atelier Rorona: The Alchemist of Arland (video game) (Pamela Ibis)
Crash Boom Bang! (video game) (Pura)
Everybody's Tennis (video game) (Eleanor)
Galaxy Angel (video game) (Noah)
Galaxy Angel II: Zettai Ryouiki no Tobira (video game) (Noah)
Galaxy Angel II: Mugen Kairou no Kagi (video game) (Noah)
Mana Khemia: Alchemists of Al-Revis (video game) (Pamela Ibis)
Trinity Universe (Pamela Ibis)
Wild Arms: The Vth Vanguard (video game) (Carol Anderson)
Night Shift Nurses (Ai Kodama)

External links

Japanese voice actresses
Living people
Voice actresses from Toyama Prefecture
1978 births